"Boom Biddy Bye Bye" is a song by American hip hop group Cypress Hill. The song was released as the third and final single from Cypress Hill III: Temples of Boom.

Track listing

References

1995 songs
1996 singles
Cypress Hill songs
Ruffhouse Records singles
Columbia Records singles
Hardcore hip hop songs
Songs written by DJ Muggs
Songs written by B-Real
Songs written by Sen Dog
Song recordings produced by DJ Muggs